Cedar Falls Township is one of seventeen rural townships in Black Hawk County, Iowa, USA.  As of the 2000 census, its population was 325.

Geography

References

External links
 US-Counties.com
 City-Data.com

Townships in Black Hawk County, Iowa
Waterloo – Cedar Falls metropolitan area
Townships in Iowa